The simple station Transversal 86 is part of the TransMilenio mass-transit system of Bogotá, Colombia, which opened in the year 2000.

Location 
The station is located in southwestern Bogotá, specifically on Avenida de Las Américas with Transversal 86.

History 
In 2003, the Las Américas line was extended from Distrito Grafiti to this station.

Before the completion of the Avenida Ciudad de Cali extension, buses without route numbers would leave this station with signs reading P.A. or PORTAL AMERICAS to the Portal de Las Américas.

Station services

Old trunk services

Main line service

Feeder routes 
This station does not have connections to feeder routes.

Inter-city service 
This station does not have inter-city service.

See also 
 Bogotá
 TransMilenio
 List of TransMilenio stations

External links 
 TransMilenio

TransMilenio